Dell'Orco is an Italian language surname.

List of people with the surname 

 Cristian Dell'Orco (born 1994), Italian footballer
 Michele Dell'Orco (born 1985), Italian politician

See also 

 Dell'Orto

Surnames
Surnames of Italian origin
Italian-language surnames